Basilia is a feminine given name. Notable people with the name include:

Basilia de Bermingham, Irish religious patron
Basilia de Worcester, wife of Meyler de Bermingham

See also
Basilea (disambiguation)

Feminine given names